Naimon, Duke of Bavaria, also called Naimes, Naime, Naymon, Namo, and Namus, is a character of the Matter of France stories concerning Charlemagne and his paladins, and appears in Old French chansons de geste (like The Song of Roland) and Italian romance epics.  He is traditionally Charlemagne's wisest and most trusted advisor.

In the Song of Roland, Naimon supports Ganelon's proposal to make peace with King Marsile. He does not suspect Ganelon's treachery. Later, he organizes the divisions of Charlemagne's army and participates in the battle against Baligant.

In Le Pèlerinage de Charlemagne he is included among the Twelve Peers.

In later romances he is given a son, Sir Bertram.

In Orlando Furioso he appears at the beginning of the story, holding Angelica captive.

Naimon's character may be summarized thus:

References

Fictional characters introduced in the 11th century
Fictional knights
Matter of France
Characters in The Song of Roland
Characters in Orlando Innamorato and Orlando Furioso
Fictional dukes and duchesses